Pennisetum alopecuroides (Pen-ih-SEE-tum al-oh-pek-yur-OY-deez), the Chinese pennisetum, Chinese fountaingrass, dwarf fountain grass, foxtail fountain grass, or swamp foxtail grass, is a species of perennial grass native to Asia and Australia. The culms are erect, and 60–100 cm long. The leaf-blades are erect or drooping; flat, or conduplicate (folded lengthwise) or involute (spiral); and from 10–45 cm long by 3–6 mm wide. 

The Latin specific epithet alopecuroides means "like the genus Alopecurus (foxtail)".

Description
It features narrow, medium to deep green leaves (to 1/2" wide) in summer, changing to golden yellow in fall, and fading to beige in late fall. The foliage usually remains attractive throughout the winter. Showy, silvery to pinkish-white, bristly, bottle brush-like flower spikes arch outward from the clump in late summer like water spraying from a fountain (hence the common name "fountain grass"). The flower spikes turn brownish as the seeds form, and usually persist until late fall or early winter before shattering.

Growing conditions
The plant generally needs a sheltered position in full sun to light shade. It prefers moist, well-drained soil. It will grow in any mild or coastal area where the temperature does not fall below . The best time of the year for planting is between late Summer and Winter.

Cultivars
The following cultivars have received gained the Royal Horticultural Society's Award of Garden Merit:
'Cassian's Choice' (brown flowerheads flushed pink)
'Hameln'  (purplish flower heads)
'Red Head'  (dark red flower heads)

Synonyms
 Alopecurus hordeiformis L.
 Panicum alopecuroides L. (basionym)
 Pennisetum compressum R. Br.
 Pennisetum hordeiforme (Thunb.) Spreng.
 Pennisetum japonicum Trin. ex Spreng.

References 

 GrassBase entry

alopecuroides
Plants described in 1753
Taxa named by Carl Linnaeus